The Golden Bull Award is a business award for SMEs in Malaysia, it has been presented annually since 2003.

Award Categories

Outstanding SMEs

SMEs with annual sales turnover of RM10 million and above up to RM75 million in the last three financial years. For service and service related sectors, the maximum annual sales turnover is RM10 million in the last three financial years.
No. of winners: 100

Emerging SMEs
SMEs with annual sales turnover below RM5 million in the last three financial years.
No. of winners: 20

Golden Bull International Cooperation Honorary Award

This award recognizes an international corporation for its collaboration with Malaysian SMEs in their growth and achievements, in particular the Golden Bull Award winners.

Judging Criteria

Evaluation of the companies' management and financial performance is done based on the following criteria:

Management outlook
Vision and mission statements
Corporate uniqueness and philosophy
Projected plan to grow in the next 3 to 5 years
Major innovations
Market presence
Information technology usage
Operating profit before tax
Sales turnover
Profit growth over last three years
Turnover growth over last three years

All nominees will be judged by the following industry groupings and judging will be based on their performances within the grouping:

Real estate and construction
Manufacturing
Trading
Telecommunications and ICT
Service sector
Others

The final list of winning companies is judged and endorsed by an independent panel of industry leaders.

Past winners
2010 Emerging SME - Sri Guan Teik Enterprise Sdn Bhd

References

External links
 Official site

Business and industry awards
Economy of Malaysia